"Room at the Top" is the first track on the album Echo by Tom Petty and the Heartbreakers, and the second single from the album. It reached number 19 on the Billboard Mainstream Rock chart.

The song is about escapism and the end of Petty's first marriage. Petty described it as one of the most depressing songs in rock history, and so intensely personal for him that once the Echo tour was over, he refused to play it.

Charts

References

1999 songs
Tom Petty songs
Songs written by Tom Petty